The obliquus capitis superior muscle is a small muscle in the upper back part of the neck and is one of the suboccipital muscles and part of the suboccipital triangle.  It arises from the lateral mass of the atlas bone. It passes superiorly and posteriorly to insert into the lateral half of the inferior nuchal line on the external surface of the occipital bone. The muscle is innervated by the suboccipital nerve, the dorsal ramus of the first spinal nerve.

It acts at the atlanto-occipital joint to extend the head and flex the head to the ipsilateral side.

Additional images

References

External links

 

Muscles of the head and neck